Creekside is a borough in Indiana County, Pennsylvania, United States. The population was 284 at the 2020 census.

Geography
Creekside is located at  (40.680353, -79.191413).

Demographics

At the 2000 census there were 323 people, 148 households, and 93 families living in the borough. The population density was 1,455.0 people per square mile (566.9/km2). There were 153 housing units at an average density of 689.2 per square mile (268.5/km2).  The racial makeup of the borough was 98.76% White, 0.62% African American, and 0.62% from two or more races. Hispanic or Latino of any race were 0.31%.

There were 148 households, 25.0% had children under the age of 18 living with them, 49.3% were married couples living together, 12.8% had a female householder with no husband present, and 36.5% were non-families. 31.8% of households were made up of individuals, and 10.1% were one person aged 65 or older. The average household size was 2.18 and the average family size was 2.77.

The age distribution was 19.5% under the age of 18, 8.4% from 18 to 24, 34.7% from 25 to 44, 22.0% from 45 to 64, and 15.5% 65 or older. The median age was 38 years. For every 100 females there were 88.9 males. For every 100 females age 18 and over, there were 85.7 males.

The median household income was $26,161 and the median family income was $30,000. Males had a median income of $24,286 versus $18,750 for females. The per capita income for the borough was $13,603. About 11.7% of families and 14.7% of the population were below the poverty line, including 32.8% of those under age 18 and 3.2% of those age 65 or over.

References

Populated places established in 1854
Boroughs in Indiana County, Pennsylvania
1854 establishments in Pennsylvania